Leigh Alderson (born 1986) is a male ballet dancer, model and actor from Portadown, Northern Ireland.

Alderson trained at The Royal Ballet School performing in Rudi van Dantzig's Four Last Songs in Toronto and Stuttgart before graduating in 2006. He joined Scottish Ballet dancing works by Ashley Page, Forsythe and Trisha Brown and Pastor and works by Richard Wherlock with New English Contemporary Ballet, later joining Atlantic Ballet Theatre of Canada and guesting with Cork City Ballet. With Les Grands Ballets Canadiens he performed in works by Stijn Celis, Stephan Thoss, The Snake in Didy Veldman's Petit Prince, Jiří Kylián's [Kaguyahime] and The Prince in Mats Ek's Sleeping Beauty.

Film and TV work has included the Canadian horror film Undress Me (2017), StreetDance 3D (2010), Angel (2009), the BBC documentary series Lost to Dance (1998) and God Given Gift (2005/07).

Awards include Royal Ballet School Achievement Award (2005 & 2006) Lynne Seymour Award for Most Expressive Dancer (2004), The NJL Choreographic Development Award (2005) and The Ulster Tatler Arts Personality of the Year Award (2009 & 2010).

Documentaries, film and TV
The BBC produced three documentary films about him. Lost To Dance was broadcast in October 1998, A God Given Gift in September 2005 and the third, also called A God Given Gift, in December 2007. All were directed and produced by the documentary film maker Claire DeLargy. The 2007 biography of Frederic Franklin notes Franklin's involvement with Alderson and his involvement in Alderson's 2005 and 2007 BBC documentaries.

Alderson began filming the independent film Angel in June 2009, co-starring the ballet dancer Kyle Davey. The film uses the score of the Scottish singer, Jerry Burns and is directed by David Council. The film had its premiere screening in The Market Place Theatre at The Stars of the Arts Gala 2010 on 19 June. An official trailer was released in July for a limited time to mark its impending release onto iTunes worldwide. It was subsequently shown at the Festival International du Court Métrage in Clermont-Ferrand and at the 10th Annual Two Short Nights Film Festival.

In July 2009, it was announced that Alderson would be attached as a featured dancer in Vertigo Films' StreetDance 3D that commenced shooting in mid-August 2009 to be released in May 2010. The film subsequently became #1 at the UK box office.

Alderson was a featured artist on BBC's arts and culture series Art Space, in the sixth and final episode of series one which was televised on Wednesday 2 June 2010 on BBC1.

Flight of Freedom
Flight of Freedom was the product of a collaborative photo-shoot between Alderson and Karin Pritzel, an award-winning photographer from Dublin. The photo first came to media attention in New York when the fashion designer Malan Breton chose it to be his official muse for his 2010 spring collection. Shortly after it became an award-winning photograph. It was then commissioned as a large scale art piece which was auctioned at The NCAD gallery in Dublin, which was organised by Fairley Pilaro in aid Of Operation Smile, a charity that raises money for children to have cleft palate operations in poor and underdeveloped countries. The picture was again auctioned for the Stars of the Arts Gala in aid of the Haiti Appeal. In 2011, it was selected to be included in a book combining art and famous inspiring quotes. The book, Quoted Moments, was launched in July 2011 in association with the Irish Cancer Society.

Books and published material
In 2007, Leslie Norton published a biography of Frederic Franklin which documented Franklin's involvement with Alderson and his 2005 and 2007 BBC documentaries.

In 2009, while still a dancer with New English Contemporary Ballet, Alderson appeared in Jim Rowbothams' photography book Strictly Ballet.
In 2010, the French author Sébastien Simoni dedicated his horror novel, Labyrinthik to Alderson.

Awards and recognition

TV, film and documentary

Ballet companies

Music

References

External links
Leigh Alderson
Leigh Alderson at New English Contemporary Ballet

1986 births
Living people
People educated at the Royal Ballet School
People from Portadown
21st-century male actors from Northern Ireland
21st-century ballet dancers